Chandai is a commune in the Orne department in north-western France. The current mayor is Serge Godard, re-elected in 2020.

See also
Communes of the Orne department

References

Communes of Orne
Orne communes articles needing translation from French Wikipedia